The First State Bank of Baggs, also known as the Bank Club, is a building in Baggs, Wyoming, USA. Built in 1907–08 to house a bank, it is one of the relatively few original buildings left in Baggs. After the bank closed in 1924, the building became a doctor's office and, during Prohibition, it housed a bootleg liquor business. After Prohibition was repealed it became Baggs Liquor. In 1946, it was renamed the Bank Club Bar.

The one story log structure is covered by stamped sheet metal and has a Greek Revival pedimented front with Ionic columns in antis between Doric pilastered walls.

The First State Bank of Baggs was placed on the National Register of Historic Places on September 13, 1984.

References

External links
 First State Bank of Baggs at the Wyioming State Historic Preservation Office

National Register of Historic Places in Carbon County, Wyoming
Commercial buildings completed in 1907
Greek Revival architecture in Wyoming
Defunct banks of the United States